Wilhelmina Maria "Wil" Burgmeijer (born 23 April 1947) is a retired Dutch speed skater who won the bronze allround medal at the 1962 world championships. She competed at the 1968 Winter Olympics in 500 m and 3,000 m and finished fifth in the latter event.

Personal bests: 
500 m – 44.9 (1970)
1000 m – 1:31.93 (1972)
1500 m – 2:19.96 (1972)
3000 m – 4:55.1 (1969)

References

1947 births
Living people
Dutch female speed skaters
Olympic speed skaters of the Netherlands
Speed skaters at the 1968 Winter Olympics
People from Nieuwkoop
Sportspeople from South Holland
20th-century Dutch women
21st-century Dutch women